Poor Things is an upcoming film directed by Yorgos Lanthimos from a screenplay by Tony McNamara, based on the 1992 novel of the same name by Alasdair Gray. Its cast includes Emma Stone, Willem Dafoe, Mark Ruffalo, Ramy Youssef, Jerrod Carmichael, Christopher Abbott, Margaret Qualley and Kathryn Hunter.

Premise
A Victorian tale of love, discovery and scientific daring, Poor Things tells the incredible story of Bella Baxter (Emma Stone), a young woman brought back to life by an eccentric but brilliant scientist.

Cast
Emma Stone as Bella Baxter
Willem Dafoe as Dr. Godwin Baxter
Mark Ruffalo as Duncan Wedderburn
Ramy Youssef as Max McCandless
Jerrod Carmichael as Harry Astley
Christopher Abbott as Sir Aubrey de la Pole Blessington
Margaret Qualley
Suzy Bemba
Kathryn Hunter as Swiney
Wayne Brett as Priest

Production
It was first reported in February 2021 that Yorgos Lanthimos and Emma Stone would reunite on the project, with a filming start of autumn 2021 reported. Willem Dafoe entered negotiations to join the cast the next month. By April, Ramy Youssef was in talks to join. Dafoe and Youssef would be confirmed to join in May, with Mark Ruffalo and Jerrod Carmichael also added to the cast in May. In September, Christopher Abbott was cast. In November, Margaret Qualley and Suzy Bemba were cast, with Kathryn Hunter revealing she had a role in the film as well.

Filming began in August 2021 in Hungary, and is expected to take place at Origo Studios.

References

External links
 

Upcoming films
British science fiction films
Films based on British novels
Films shot in Hungary
Films directed by Yorgos Lanthimos
English-language Irish films
American science fiction films
Film4 Productions films
Searchlight Pictures films